Trial by Fire is a 2008 Canadian adventure television film starring Brooke Burns and Rick Ravanello.  The film has been distributed commercially under the title Smoke Jumper. It premiered in the US on Lifetime on September 27, 2008.

A young woman firefighter is unfairly blamed for causing her firefighter father's death. She sets her sights on becoming a smokejumper. During the grueling basic training, she earns the respect of her instructors. Because of an emergency, she is allowed to jump on a fire before even finishing training. She performs admirably saving several lives.

Casting 
 Brooke Burns - Kristin Scott
 Erin Karpluk - Chelsea
 Robert Moloney - Dan
 Winston Rekert - Hank
 Rick Ravanello - Ray Kulhanek
 Rex Linn - Chief Bill Berry
 Ryan Grantham - Little boy

See also
List of firefighting films

References

External links

Films about firefighting
2008 action drama films
2008 television films
2008 films
Canadian action adventure films
Canadian action drama films
Canadian drama television films
CineTel Films films
English-language Canadian films
Lifetime (TV network) films
Films about wildfires
Films directed by John Terlesky
2000s Canadian films